Lefe Isa is a town in eastern Ethiopia. Located in the Fafan Zone of the Somali Region. It is administered under the Awbare district.

Demographics
The town is inhabited by the Reer Mohamuud and Reer Faarah subclans of the Jibriil Yoonis branch of the Gadabuursi Dir clan.

Filipo Ambrosio (1994) describes Lefe Isa as being predominantly Gadabuursi:
"Jarso and Geri then sought refuge on 'neutral' adjacent Gadabursi territory in Heregel, Jarre and Lefeisa."

References

Populated places in the Somali Region